Nicholas O'Connor (born 20 April 1945) is a former Irish Fianna Fáil politician. He served as a member of Seanad Éireann from 1987 to 1989. He was nominated by the Taoiseach Charles Haughey to the 18th Seanad in 1987. He was an unsuccessful candidate at the 1989 Seanad election.

References

1945 births
Living people
Fianna Fáil senators
Members of the 18th Seanad
Nominated members of Seanad Éireann